Tempane District is one of the fifteen districts in Upper East Region, Ghana. Originally it was formerly part of the then-larger Garu-Tempane District in 2004, until the southeast part of the district was split off to create Tempane District on 15 February 2018; thus the remaining part has been renamed as Garu District. The district assembly is located in the eastern part of Upper East Region and has Tempane as its capital town.

Sources

References

Districts of Upper East Region